The Shenshan Expressway is a  expressway in the People's Republic of China connecting the cities of Shenzhen and Shantou in the province of Guangdong.

 

Expressways in China
Expressways in Shenzhen
Transport in Guangdong